Bart Steven Oates (born December 16, 1958) is a former American football player in the National Football League (NFL) for the New York Giants and San Francisco 49ers.  He played center for the Giants from 1985 to 1993 and with the 49ers from 1994 to 1995.  He was a member of the Giants teams that won Super Bowls XXI and XXV and the 49ers team that won Super Bowl XXIX.

College career
A graduate of Albany High School in Georgia, Oates played college football at Brigham Young University (BYU), originally entering in 1977 before serving an 2-year mission for the Church of Jesus Christ of Latter-day Saints in Las Vegas, Nevada then later joining the Cougars football team. Oates earned a BS in Accounting from the Marriott School of Business there in 1985, and he was inducted into the BYU athletic Hall of Fame in 1992.

Professional career
The Giants signed Oates in 1985 at the relatively advanced age of 26.  This was because he had initially played three seasons with the Philadelphia/Baltimore Stars in the USFL where he won two USFL championships. Oates has stated that he feels the 1985 Philadelphia Stars of the USFL could have beaten the 1985 Philadelphia Eagles.  Oates won three Super Bowls, two with the Giants in 1987 and 1991, and one with the 49ers in 1995. Oates was selected to five Pro Bowls during his career and to the UPI All-NFC team three times.  He was extremely durable, starting 125 consecutive games during his Giants career.

Television work
Oates worked as a color analyst for NFL games on NBC television in 1996, teaming with either Dan Hicks or, when Hicks is away on assignment, Jim Donovan. In 2006, he voiced himself in the Aqua Teen Hunger Force episode "Bart Oates".

Law career
Oates attended law school classes during the off-season of football and graduated magna cum laude with a Juris Doctor degree from Seton Hall Law School in 1990. He worked in New Jersey with the firms of Ribis Graham and Curtin in Morristown, Raymond Koski and Associates in Fort Lee and the real estate company Gale and Wentworth in Florham Park. His primary focus of practice was real estate and health care. He is a member of the New Jersey State Bar Association.

Civic and corporate roles
Oates was chairman of the New Jersey Hall of Fame, a Hall of Fame for New Jersey residents in a variety of fields ranging from scientists to athletes. He was selected to be inducted into the New Jersey Hall of Fame Class of 2019.   He also spent time helping out as the line coach at Seton Hall Preparatory School earlier in the decade. He currently serves as the Bishop (lay Pastor) of the Morristown 1st Ward of the Church of Jesus Christ of Latter Day Saints.

Personal life
Oates and his wife, Michelle, have three children and reside in Harding Township, New Jersey. His brother, Brad, also played offensive line in the NFL for six seasons on five teams.

See also
 History of the New York Giants (1979–93)

References

External links
 
 BYU profile

1958 births
Living people
American football centers
BYU Cougars football players
National Football League announcers
New York Giants players
Philadelphia/Baltimore Stars players
San Francisco 49ers players
National Conference Pro Bowl players
New Jersey lawyers
Seton Hall University School of Law alumni
People from Harding Township, New Jersey
Sportspeople from Albany, Georgia
Players of American football from Georgia (U.S. state)
American Mormon missionaries in the United States